Statistics of Liberian Premier League in season 1987.

Overview
Invincible Eleven won the championship.

References
Liberia - List of final tables (RSSSF)

Football competitions in Liberia